WBRY (1540 AM) is a radio station broadcasting a country music format. Licensed to Woodbury, Tennessee, United States, the station is owned by Volunteer Broadcasting, LLC and features programming from Citadel Broadcasting.

Translators
WBRY programming is also carried on a broadcast translator station to extend or improve the coverage area of the primary station.

References

External links
 

Country radio stations in the United States
BRY
BRY